The Guayanilla Formation is a geologic formation in Puerto Rico. It preserves fossils dating back to the Paleogene period.

See also

 List of fossiliferous stratigraphic units in Puerto Rico

References
 

Paleogene Puerto Rico